Will Harris (born 8 June 2000, in Australia) is an Australian rugby union player who plays for the NSW Waratahs in Super Rugby. His playing position is number 8. He has signed to the Waratahs squad for the 2020 season.

Reference list

External links
Rugby.com.au profile
itsrugby.co.uk profile

2000 births
Australian rugby union players
Living people
Rugby union number eights
New South Wales Waratahs players
Rugby union flankers
New South Wales Country Eagles players